The 2015 Cash Converters Players Championship Finals was the seventh edition of the PDC darts tournament, the Players Championship Finals, which saw the top 32 players from the 2015 PDC Pro Tour Order of Merit took part. The tournament took place at Butlin's Minehead in Minehead, England, between 27–29 November 2015.

The defending champion Gary Anderson lost 4–10 against Daryl Gurney in the 2nd round.

Michael van Gerwen won his 13th PDC major title by beating Adrian Lewis 11–6 in the final.

Prize money

Qualification
The top 32 players of the PDC Pro Tour Order of Merit qualified for this event.

Draw
There was no draw held, but all players were put in a fixed bracket by their seeding positions.

Statistics

References

External links
PDC; schedule of play

Players Championship Finals
Players Championship Finals
Players Championship Finals
Players Championship Finals
Minehead
Sports competitions in Somerset
2010s in Somerset